Joachim Beuckelaer (c. 1533 – c. 1570/4) was a Flemish painter specialising in market and kitchen scenes with elaborate displays of food and household equipment.  He also painted still lifes with no figures in the central scene. His development of the genre of market and kitchen scenes was influential on the development of still life art in Northern Europe as well as Italy.

Life
Details about the life of the artist are scarce.  Beuckelaer was born in Antwerp into a family of painters.  He was likely the son of the painter Mattheus Beuckeleer and the brother of Huybrecht Beuckeleer. His brother also became a painter and the works of Huybrecht have occasionally been misattributed to Joachim. He possibly learned to paint in the workshop of his uncle, Pieter Aertsen, who had married his aunt Kathelijne Beuckelaer. Aertsen was best known for his market and kitchen scenes, genres. Beuckelaer became an independent master in the Antwerp Guild of Saint Luke in 1560.

Beuckelaer remained active in Antwerp throughout his career and continued to develop themes pioneered in painting by Aertsen, but arguably surpassing his presumed master in skill. The date of his death is not known with certainty but fell likely between 1570 and 1574.

Work
Beuckelaer specialised in market and kitchen scenes with elaborate displays of food and household equipment. During the 1560s, especially during the early part of the decade, Beuckelaer painted some purely religious works, for which, unlike the kitchen and market scenes, drawings are known. In this period he also made designs for stained glass. 

Beuckelaer's market scenes, like those of Aertsen, often incorporate biblical episodes in the background. His Four Elements series, acquired by the National Gallery, London in 2001, exemplifies this on a large scale. Water, for example, shows a fish market selling twelve kinds of fish, representing the twelve disciples of Jesus. Through an archway in the background Christ can be seen walking on the Sea of Galilee after his resurrection, making fish appear miraculously in empty nets.

Both Aertsen and Beuckelaer gradually developed images that detached the world of produce from the religious content of their earlier hybrid images.  These later works depict either kitchens or markets and the persons associated with those activities, more often women than men.  The later paintings by Beuckelaer show a greater profusion of foodstuffs in the market scenes, together with a more prominent foregrounding of female peasants immersed within these sales items.  Beuckelaer also produced several images of fish stalls, often with background religious scenes, but sometimes completely separated from any additional narrative or reference. In the year 1563 Beuckelaer was experimenting with more outspoken landscape settings in an innovative way, which left its marks with later artists in Antwerp.

One of the still lives without figures in the kitchen or market scene itself is the Kitchen scene with Christ at Emmaus (c. 1660/65, Mauritshuis, The Hague) is unique in his oeuvre. In this composition Beuckelaer painted a kitchen with numerous ingredients for a lavish meal: vegetables, fruits, nuts, poultry and a large cut of meat. The table linen and crockery are also in view. In the background, Beuckelaer depicted the biblical story of Christ at Emmaus. This story is pushed into the background while the secondary matter of the dinner preparations for Christ's visit at Emmaus has become the painting’s main subject. This and similar scenes are regarded as the forerunners of the still-lifes of the 17th century, in which the narrative elements vanished entirely.

His still life of a carcass referred to as Slaughtered pig (Wallraf-Richartz Museum) dated 1563 is likely the earliest dated example of this subject.

Beuckelaer was also employed painting the figures in the work of other artists such as Anthonis Mor and Cornelis van Dalem. The 17th century biographer Karel van Mander claimed that the artist was only able to sell his paintings at low prices, and that they only became prized after his death. However, the large size of his later works and the number of workshop variants produced has been taken as an indication of a degree of success at least towards the end of his life.

Research into the technique underlying Beuckelaer's canvases has shown that he often recycled his own compositions from one image to the next.  He employed patterns of clustered items through tracings to compose new pictures with apparent variety.  This kind of technique allowed him to increase production efficiency and cut costs in time and effort.

His work was influential.  The Flemish still life and animal painter Frans Snyders developed his Baroque many market scenes by taking inspiration of the work of Aertsen and Beuckelaer. Northern Italian painters such as Vincenzo Campi and Jacopo Bassano were also influenced by his work.

References

External links

Flemish Renaissance painters
Flemish still life painters
Flemish genre painters
Painters from Antwerp
1533 births
1574 deaths